Emery High School may refer to several schools in the United States:

 Emery High School (Castle Dale, Utah), Castle Dale, Utah
 Emery High School (Emery, South Dakota), Emery, South Dakota
 Emery Secondary School, Emeryville, California
 The Emery/Weiner School, Houston, Texas

There is one high school in Canada with a similar name:

 Emery Collegiate Institute, Toronto, Ontario, Canada